Valentinas Laskys (1953 – 12 December 1993) was a Lithuanian serial killer who, together with his daughter, robbed and killed four people. He was executed by shooting for these crimes.

Early life
During his infancy, Laskys was taken away from his mother due to neglect. He grew up in a care home, transferred from primary school to a specialized care home.

Murders
Throughout his criminal career, Laskys was convicted seven times before being sentenced to death. In 1991, after committing a murder in Minsk, he went into hiding in Russia, Georgia and Moldova where he was arrested in Chișinău.

Trial and execution 
On 5 August 1993, Laskys was found guilty of committing at least three murders since 1990. The court sentenced him to death. 

Laskys was executed by shooting at Lukiškės Prison on 12 December 1993. Vladimiras Ivanovas was also executed on the same day for killing a mother and her 4-year old daughter.

See also
 List of serial killers by country
 Capital punishment in Lithuania

References 

1953 births
1993 deaths
20th-century criminals
20th-century executions by Lithuania
Executed Lithuanian serial killers
Executed Soviet serial killers
Male serial killers
Lithuanian people convicted of murder
People convicted of murder by Lithuania
People convicted of robbery
People executed by Lithuania by firearm
People from Kaunas